There Came a Lion is an album by Ivoryline. It was released on February 5, 2008, through Tooth & Nail Records.

Track listing
"Days End" – 3:08
"We Both Know" – 3:06
"Parade" – 3:38
"All You Ever Hear" – 4:06
"Be Still and Breathe" – 3:26
"Remind Me I'm Alive" – 3:33
"Left Us Falling" – 3:03
"And the Truth Will End This" – 3:50
"Bravery" – 3:59
"Hearts and Minds" – 3:47
"The Last Words" – 4:22

References

External links

2008 albums
Ivoryline albums
Tooth & Nail Records albums